Frank Walter Blake Vale (26/10/1908 - 21/5/2006) was best known as a pioneer of the Australian cold storage industry and the Victorian dairy factory industry.

Early life and education
Vale was born on 26 October 1908 (one of 12 children) in Toora, Victoria, a small farming community in South Gippsland, Victoria, Australia. Vale's parents and siblings lived on an estate at Tarwin Meadows, a large dairy property with 1,000 cows, for which his father was a bookkeeper. He attended school at Tarwin Meadows, finishing in the 8th grade at 14 years of age and obtaining his merit certificate with a high rating.

Memoria
His distinguished career in the industry is widely recognized and acknowledged through the "Frank Vale Award" which is presented annually at the Refrigerated Warehouse & Transport Association of Australia (RWTA) Conference and Exhibition to an outstanding young achiever.

References

1908 births
2006 deaths
People from Victoria (Australia)
20th-century Australian businesspeople